Bala Velayat Rural District is a rural district (dehestan) in the Central District of Torbat-e Heydarieh County, Razavi Khorasan Province, Iran. At the 2006 census, its population was 20,908, in 5,698 families.  The rural district has 32 villages.

References 

Rural Districts of Razavi Khorasan Province
Torbat-e Heydarieh County